Amir Muqam Khan (Urdu:امير مقام خان; born 25 July 1963) is a Pakistani politician, national conservative, and mechanical engineer who was Advisor to Prime Minister on federal departments in Khyber Pakhtunkhwa since 29 October 2013.

He is also President of Pakistan Muslim League (N) Khyber Pakhtunkhawa.

Early life
Amir Muqam was born at village Chagum Puran Tehsil in Shangla town, Khyber-Pakhtunkhwa, Pakistan, on 25 July 1963 into a Pakhtoon family. After matriculating from a local high school, Muqam enrolled at the University of Engineering and Technology in Peshawar in 1983 to study engineering. In 1988, Muqam graduated from UET Peshawar with BSc in Mechanical engineering. His brother Ibadullah Khan is also politician in Pakistan Muslim League (N) (PML-N).

Political career
In 1998, Muqam was elected as general secretary of the Cantonments Association till he remained until 2001. In 2001, Muqam was elected unopposed as Nazim of Bengali Chagum Union Council after participating in local government elections.
Amir Muqam won 2002 Pakistani general election on the ticket of Muttahida Majlis Amal from NA-31 constituency. However, after winning elections Muqam defected to PML(Q) to support Gen. Pervez Musharraf. During Pervez Musharraf tenure he enjoyed close ties with him, Pervez Musharraf called him his brother and gifted him a personal Glock pistol. Muqam was made Minister of State for Water and Power and Political Affairs. 
Muqam won the general elections from NA 38 Shangla on PML(Q) ticket. He obtained 25,960	against his opponent Safeer Khan from ANP.

Before 2013 Pakistani general election he left  PML(Q) on reportedly some difference with Chaudhry Shujaat Hussain Muqam announced to join the PML(N) after holding a meeting with Nawaz Sharif and was appointed Senior vice President of the party. 
 
Amir Muqam contested from NA-30 (Swat-II) in 2013 Pakistani general election, however, he lost the seat from Salim Rehman of Pakistan Tehreek-e-Insaf.

In 2018 Pakistani general election Muqam contested two national assembly and two provisional assembly seats, however, he lost all fours seats. From NA-2 (Swat-I) he got 41125 votes and stood second, from NA-29 (Peshawar-III) he stood fifth and obtained just 10569 votes. He also lost two provisional seats PK-2 (Swat) and PK 4 (Swat 3).

Electoral history

2002 
Amir Muqam contested the elections on MMA ticket however, after winning the election he defected to General Pervaiz Musharraf's PML(Q).

2008 
Muqam contested 2008 Pakistani general election on PML(Q)'s ticket and won from NA-31 (Shangla). However, later he developed a difference with Chaudhry Shujaat Hussain and joined PML(N).

2013 
Amir Muqam Contested 2013 from NA-30 (Swat-II) however, he lost the seat from Salim Rehman of Pakistan Tehreek-e-Insaf.

2018 
In 2018, Amir Muqam contested two provisional seats NA-29 (Peshawar-III) and NA-2 (Swat-I). He finished fourth in NA-29 (Peshawar-III) and second in NA-2 (Swat-I). He also contested two provisional seats PK-2 (Swat) and PK 4 (Swat 3) and lost both.

Controversies and Scandals 
National Accountability Bureau summoned Muqam in assets beyond his known sources cases multiple times. A new reference was filed against Amir Muqam in 2021 

Amir Muqam's son was arrested over corruption charges in the construction of Alpari Road in KP’s Shangla district by Federal Investigation Agency, the project was assigned during Pakistan Muslim League (N) tenure on the recommendation of Ameer Muqam.

References

External links 
 Shangla
 Puran

1963 births
Living people
Pakistani Muslims
Pashtun people
People from Shangla District
People from Swat District
University of Engineering & Technology, Peshawar alumni
Pakistan Muslim League (N) politicians
Pakistani MNAs 2002–2007
Pakistani MNAs 2008–2013
Pakistan Muslim League (Q) MNAs